Tashkent Institute of Architecture and Civil Engineering, previously known as Tashkent Architectural Construction Institute was organized by the Decree of the President of the Republic of Uzbekistan (№ 400, May 6, 1991) as part of Tashkent State Technical University. The Institute offers architectural and construction. The Institute has the faculty of Architecture, Department of Building and Construction, Civil Engineering and Construction Management, as well as the department of International Relations.

Full-time and part-time faculty train more than 3,000 students from 16 educational areas, which include 20 specialties. During training, students have the opportunity to develop theoretical knowledge and research skills. Scientific and educational work are by more than 200 highly qualified professors. Specialised unions offer doctoral and master's theses in architecture and construction.

The Institute's research is included in the State Science and Technology Plan of the Republic of Uzbekistan. The Institute's specialists design public and residential buildings, industrial and agricultural waste disposal facilities, develop and organize production of efficient building materials and construction, and ensure earthquake resistance. 
Inha University in Tashkent
Tashkent State Technical University
Tashkent Institute of Irrigation and Melioration
Tashkent Financial Institute
Tashkent Automobile and Road Construction Institute
Management Development Institute of Singapore in Tashkent
Tashkent State University of Economics
Tashkent State Agrarian University
Tashkent State University of Law
Tashkent University of Information Technologies
University of World Economy and Diplomacy
Westminster International University in Tashkent

Educational institutions established in 1991
Schools in Uzbekistan
Education in Tashkent
1991 establishments in Uzbekistan